Kuwait English School (abbreviation: KES) is an independent and private international school in Kuwait. The main campus of the school is located in Salwa. It provides a British curriculum education from Kindergarten through A-levels. It is estimated that the school employs between 100 and 400 faculty, with around 2500 students enrolled.

History 
The Kuwait English School was established in 1978 by Jassim Al Saddah, who acts as the current chairman of the school, alongside Rhoda Elizabeth Muhmood, who acts as the school's director. The school was originally a villa until 1984 where they established a "proper" school facility.

In 1991, the school opened the Green Unit, a program catering toward students with learning disabilities. Shortly after the liberation of Kuwait, the school was visited by Anne, Princess Royal. Shortly after, in 1997, the school opened a specialised learning centre known as the "Milennium Centre". This centre was opened by then-Under-Secretary Of State for the Ministry of Higher Education Rasha Al Sabah.

Sports
The Kuwait English School has an after-school sports program under the BSME Games conference. Students may join teams divided by the junior and senior programs, including football, basketball, volleyball, unihoc, netball, benchball, cricket, and swimming.

References

British international schools in Kuwait
Private schools in Kuwait
Educational institutions established in 1979
1979 establishments in Kuwait